Kozarze  is a village in the administrative district of Gmina Ciechanowiec, within Wysokie Mazowieckie County, Podlaskie Voivodeship, in north-eastern Poland.

The village has a population of 390.

Notable people
 

Izydor Szaraniewicz (1829–1901), Ukrainian historian

References

Kozarze